Tatiana Aleksandrovna Borodulina (born 22 December 1984 in Omsk, Russia) is a Russian short-track speed skater, who formerly represented Australia.

Career
Borodulina competed for Russia at the 2006 Winter Olympics in Torino, Italy. She was a finalist in the 1500m, but was disqualified.

Move to Australia
Borodulina moved to Australia in 2006, having received a ban from Russian short track for being absent for a doping test. She resided in Sunnybank Hills, Brisbane.  She won two gold medals and a bronze medal in the 2009 Short Track Speed Skating World Cup season. Legislation had to be passed to amend the Australian Citizenship Act so that Borodulina would receive citizenship in time to compete at the 2010 Winter Olympic Games in Vancouver, British Columbia, Canada after missing the cut-off mark by 18 days. Australian Immigration Minister Chris Evans said this amendment benefited a number of athletes who had moved to Australia. She even joined the Australian Army Reserve on April 18, 2009 in an effort to fast-track her Australian citizenship.
But she left Australia after the 2010 Olympics.

2010 Winter Olympics
At Vancouver 2010 Winter Olympic Games, Borodulina competed for adopted country of Australia. She came 11th in the Women's Short Track Speed Skating 1500m finals. She has qualified for the quarter-finals for the 1000 m. Borodulina failed to qualify for the 500 m event, with a final ranking of 21st.

2014 Winter Olympics
Borodulina has officially admitted to the Italian news her commitment to compete once again for her native country Russia.

References

External links
 Tatiana Borodulina at Torino2006.org
 Tatiana Borodulina at Vancouver2010.com
 
 

1984 births
Living people
Australian female short track speed skaters
Russian female short track speed skaters
Short track speed skaters at the 2006 Winter Olympics
Short track speed skaters at the 2010 Winter Olympics
Short track speed skaters at the 2014 Winter Olympics
Olympic short track speed skaters of Australia
Olympic short track speed skaters of Russia
Russian sportspeople in doping cases
Sportspeople from Omsk
Doping cases in short track speed skating